Lycaena bleusei, the Iberian sooty copper, is a butterfly of the family Lycaenidae, subfamily Lycaeninae. It is found in Portugal and Spain, in Europe.

The butterfly flies from late March to November, depending on the location.

The larvae feed on Rumex acetosa, Rumex acetosella, Rumex crispus and other docks.

Populations of this species are found chiefly in central Spain and Central-northern Portugal, where the species is a specialist of meadows which tend to dry out during the summer, contrary to its sister species Lycaena tityrus

References

bleusei
Butterflies of Europe
Butterflies described in 1884
Taxa named by Charles Oberthür